Los Toldos is an archaeological site in Santa Cruz, Argentina, which has evidenced human activity dating back almost 13,000 years ago. It is the namesake of the Toldense culture group.

Location 
The site is located south of the Deseado River, in the Canadon de las Cuevas.

Cave 3 
Cave 3 of Los Toldos is located next to a ravine. Human settlement of the cave is dated around 12,000 years ago. The entrance to the cave is approximately 12 meters wide. Excavations carried out by archaeologist  and a team of specialists and students from the National University of La Plata (UNLP) have excavated twelve archaeological strata in the cave, with a total depth of two meters:

See also 
 Cueva de las Manos — Nearby cave site with prehistoric paintings, also containing Toldense artifacts
 Piedra Museo — Nearby archaeological site with Toldense artifacts

Notes

References

Further reading 
 
 Cardich, Augusto (1985). "Una fecha radiocarbonica mas de la cueva 3 de Los Toldos (Santa Cruz, Argentina)" Relaciones de la Sociedad Argentina de Antropología, Nueva Serie 16: 269–275.

External links 
 Welcome Argentina: Expediciones Arqueológicas en Los Toldos y en Piedra Museo

Archaeological sites in Argentina
Peopling of the Americas